The white-headed robin-chat (Cossypha heinrichi) is a species of bird in the family Muscicapidae. It is found in northern Angola and the western Democratic Republic of the Congo. It is threatened by habitat loss, and its IUCN conservation status is the least concern.

Taxonomy
In 1954, Gerd Heinrich collected bird specimens in Angola, and the specimens were shipped to the Chicago Natural History Museum. Three of the specimens were white-headed robin-chats, and in 1955, Austin L. Rand described them as Cossypha heinrichi. The species is monotypic.

Description
The head and neck are white. The entirely white head is unique among the African robins. The mantle, back and scapulars are olive-brown, with the back and scapulars being greyer. The rump is rufous-orange. The central tail feathers are black, and the outer feathers are orange-rufous. The flight feathers and wing coverts are blackish brown, with olive-brown edges. The underwing coverts are grey. The underparts are rufous-chestnut or sienna. The beak is black, and the legs are grey or black. The female has a shorter tail than the male. The juvenile bird's head and breast are buffish-brown, and its back has orange-buff spots. It has browner underparts and brownish-grey legs. Juveniles moulting into first-year plumage have been observed in April and November.

Distribution and habitat
In the western Democratic Republic of the Congo, it has been recorded in Bombo-Lumene Forest Reserve and a few nearby sites. In the Democratic Republic of the Congo, it has been found in isolated patches of thick forest.

Behaviour
The white-headed robin-chat eats insects, foraging for driver ants on the ground and also catching insects in the air. Its song is repeated whistles that begin quietly and then become much louder. A high-pitched whistle has also been recorded. During observations in 2005, playback of its voice caused a "frantic" response. It often fans its tail. Its breeding is not well known. In Angola, observations suggest that the breeding season includes February, October and November. In the Democratic Republic of the Congo, it breeds from September to November.

Status
The population size is estimated at 6,000 to 15,000 mature individuals and 10,000 to 19,999 total individuals. The population is probably declining because of habitat loss. In Bombo-Lumene Forest Reserve, the species is threatened by deforestation for charcoal. In Angola, forest clearance and slash-and-burn agriculture threaten it. Despite oits small range and threatened habitat, the IUCN Red List of Threatened Species has assessed the species as least concern.

References

Cossypha
Birds described in 1955
Taxa named by Austin L. Rand
Taxonomy articles created by Polbot